This page lists all described species of the spider family Migidae accepted by the World Spider Catalog :

B

Bertmainius

Bertmainius Harvey, Main, Rix & Cooper, 2015
 B. colonus Harvey, Main, Rix & Cooper, 2015 — Australia (Western Australia)
 B. monachus Harvey, Main, Rix & Cooper, 2015 — Australia (Western Australia)
 B. mysticus Harvey, Main, Rix & Cooper, 2015 — Australia (Western Australia)
 B. opimus Harvey, Main, Rix & Cooper, 2015 — Australia (Western Australia)
 B. pandus Harvey, Main, Rix & Cooper, 2015 — Australia (Western Australia)
 B. tingle (Main, 1991) (type) — Australia (Western Australia)
 B. tumidus Harvey, Main, Rix & Cooper, 2015 — Australia (Western Australia)

C

Calathotarsus

Calathotarsus Simon, 1903
 C. coronatus Simon, 1903 (type) — Chile
 C. fangioi Ferretti, Soresi, González & Arnedo, 2019 — Argentina
 C. pihuychen Goloboff, 1991 — Chile
 C. simoni Schiapelli & Gerschman, 1975 — Argentina

G

Goloboffia

Goloboffia Griswold & Ledford, 2001
 G. biberi Ferretti, Ríos-Tamayo & Goloboff, 2019 — Chile
 G. griswoldi Ferretti, Ríos-Tamayo & Goloboff, 2019 — Chile
 G. megadeth Ferretti, Ríos-Tamayo & Goloboff, 2019 — Chile
 G. pachelbeli Ferretti, Ríos-Tamayo & Goloboff, 2019 — Chile
 G. vellardi (Zapfe, 1961) (type) — Chile

H

Heteromigas

Heteromigas Hogg, 1902
 H. dovei Hogg, 1902 (type) — Australia (Tasmania)
 H. terraereginae Raven, 1984 — Australia (Queensland)

M

Mallecomigas

Mallecomigas Goloboff & Platnick, 1987
 M. schlingeri Goloboff & Platnick, 1987 (type) — Chile

Micromesomma

Micromesomma Pocock, 1895
 M. cowani Pocock, 1895 (type) — Madagascar

Migas

Migas L. Koch, 1873
 M. affinis Berland, 1924 — New Caledonia
 M. australis Wilton, 1968 — New Zealand
 M. borealis Wilton, 1968 — New Zealand
 M. cambridgei Wilton, 1968 — New Zealand
 M. cantuarius Wilton, 1968 — New Zealand
 M. centralis Wilton, 1968 — New Zealand
 M. cumberi Wilton, 1968 — New Zealand
 M. distinctus O. Pickard-Cambridge, 1880 — New Zealand
 M. gatenbyi Wilton, 1968 — New Zealand
 M. giveni Wilton, 1968 — New Zealand
 M. goyeni Wilton, 1968 — New Zealand
 M. hesperus Wilton, 1968 — New Zealand
 M. hollowayi Wilton, 1968 — New Zealand
 M. insularis Wilton, 1968 — New Zealand
 M. kirki Wilton, 1968 — New Zealand
 M. kochi Wilton, 1968 — New Zealand
 M. linburnensis Wilton, 1968 — New Zealand
 M. lomasi Wilton, 1968 — New Zealand
 M. marplesi Wilton, 1968 — New Zealand
 M. minor Wilton, 1968 — New Zealand
 M. nitens Hickman, 1927 — Australia (Tasmania)
 M. otari Wilton, 1968 — New Zealand
 M. paradoxus L. Koch, 1873 (type) — New Zealand
 M. plomleyi Raven & Churchill, 1989 — Australia (Tasmania)
 M. quintus Wilton, 1968 — New Zealand
 M. sandageri Goyen, 1890 — New Zealand
 M. saxatilis Wilton, 1968 — New Zealand
 M. secundus Wilton, 1968 — New Zealand
 M. solitarius Wilton, 1968 — New Zealand
 M. taierii Todd, 1945 — New Zealand
 M. tasmani Wilton, 1968 — New Zealand
 M. toddae Wilton, 1968 — New Zealand
 M. tuhoe Wilton, 1968 — New Zealand
 M. variapalpus Raven, 1984 — Australia (Queensland)

Moggridgea

Moggridgea O. Pickard-Cambridge, 1875
 M. albimaculata Hewitt, 1925 — South Africa
 M. ampullata Griswold, 1987 — South Africa
 M. anactenidia Griswold, 1987 — Cameroon
 M. breyeri Hewitt, 1915 — South Africa
 M. clypeostriata Benoit, 1962 — Congo
 M. crudeni Hewitt, 1913 — South Africa
 M. dyeri O. Pickard-Cambridge, 1875 (type) — South Africa
 M. eremicola Griswold, 1987 — Namibia
 M. intermedia Hewitt, 1913 — South Africa
 M. leipoldti Purcell, 1903 — South Africa
 M. loistata Griswold, 1987 — South Africa
 M. microps Hewitt, 1915 — South Africa
 M. mordax Purcell, 1903 — South Africa
 M. nesiota Griswold, 1987 — Comoros
 M. occidua Simon, 1907 — São Tomé and Príncipe
 M. pallida Hewitt, 1914 — Namibia
 M. paucispina Hewitt, 1916 — South Africa
 M. peringueyi Simon, 1903 — South Africa
 M. pseudocrudeni Hewitt, 1919 — South Africa
 M. purpurea Lawrence, 1928 — Namibia
 M. pymi Hewitt, 1914 — Zimbabwe, South Africa
 M. quercina Simon, 1903 — South Africa
 M. rainbowi (Pulleine, 1919) — Australia (South Australia)
 M. rupicola Hewitt, 1913 — South Africa
 M. rupicoloides Hewitt, 1914 — South Africa
 M. socotra Griswold, 1987 — Yemen (Socotra)
 M. tanypalpa Griswold, 1987 — Angola
 M. teresae Griswold, 1987 — South Africa
 M. terrestris Hewitt, 1914 — South Africa
 M. terricola Simon, 1903 — South Africa
 M. verruculata Griswold, 1987 — Congo
 M. whytei Pocock, 1897 — Central Africa

P

Paramigas

Paramigas Pocock, 1895
 P. alluaudi (Simon, 1903) — Madagascar
 P. andasibe Raven, 2001 — Madagascar
 P. goodmani Griswold & Ledford, 2001 — Madagascar
 P. macrops Griswold & Ledford, 2001 — Madagascar
 P. manakambus Griswold & Ledford, 2001 — Madagascar
 P. milloti Griswold & Ledford, 2001 — Madagascar
 P. oracle Griswold & Ledford, 2001 — Madagascar
 P. pauliani (Dresco & Canard, 1975) — Madagascar
 P. pectinatus Griswold & Ledford, 2001 — Madagascar
 P. perroti (Simon, 1891) (type) — Madagascar
 P. rothorum Griswold & Ledford, 2001 — Madagascar

Poecilomigas

Poecilomigas Simon, 1903
 P. abrahami (O. Pickard-Cambridge, 1889) (type) — South Africa
 P. basilleupi Benoit, 1962 — Tanzania
 P. elegans Griswold, 1987 — South Africa

T

Thyropoeus

Thyropoeus Pocock, 1895
 T. malagasus (Strand, 1908) — Madagascar
 T. mirandus Pocock, 1895 (type) — Madagascar

References

Migidae